Stuart Gray (born 1961), better known by his moniker Stu Spasm, is an Australian musician and composer best recognized as the frontman for the experimental noise rock outfit Lubricated Goat.

Biography 
Spasm (Gray) commenced his musical journey in Adelaide, South Australia.  A devotee of Adelaide’s bourgeoning Punk scene, Spasm worked hard on his guitar playing, developing a New York Dolls/Johnny Thunders repertoire. 

His first band named Exhibit A played primarily covers sourced from the Dolls, MC5, Birdman and  other east coast US artists. Spasm had already displayed a canny understanding of “who could be of help” before leaving for Sydney.

Stu Spasm joined the band Salamander Jim, who had already been active since the early eighties, to record their 1985 debut album Lorne Green Shares His Precious Fluids. Spasm soon left the group to pursue his own musical interests and formed Lubricated Goat in Perth in 1986.

In addition to himself, the line-up included former Salamander Jim drummer Martin Bland and ex-Kryptonics members Brett Ford and Pete Hartley. John Foy, founder of the Sydney-based label Red Eye Records, was so impressed by Lubricated Goat's music and antics that he created Black Eye Records for the band to issue their records through. Spasm became the group's principal songwriter and penned the majority of their oeuvre.

In 1990, while touring Europe to promote Psychedelicatessen, Spasm was stabbed (by Arab heroin dealers in a "transaction gone wrong") in Berlin. He put the band on hiatus and moved to New York where he met and began a relationship with Kat Bjelland of Babes in Toyland. They married in 1992 and began composing songs together. During this time Spasm began recording under the name Lubricated Goat with an entirely different line-up and recorded the material that would comprise Forces You Don't Understand. Along with drummer Russell Simins of The Blues Explosion, Bjelland and Spasm formed Crunt and released a self-titled album in 1994. The group was short lived however, as Bjelland and Spasm divorced in January 1995.

Spasm continued to play under the Lubricated Goat moniker with members such as Rich Hutchins of Live Skull and Jack Natz of Cop Shoot Cop. In February 2015 he formed his new outfit, The Art Gray Noizz Quintet, with Hutchins, Skeleton Boy (formerly of Woman) on bass, Andrea Sicco (of Twin Guns) on guitar, and rotating fifth members such as metal percussionists or brass players. The band was initially put together to perform at an afterparty for the New York premiere of The Color Of Noise, a documentary on Minneapolis Noise Rock label Amphetamine Reptile, as Spasm was heavily featured in the film. A live recording documenting the group performing one of the last shows before pandemic lockdown restrictions shut New York City was released on Primitive Screwhead Tapes in 2021.  The group released their debut self-titled LP on Bang! Records in May of 2022.

Discography

Salamander Jim

Lubricated Goat

Crunt

The Art Gray Noizz Quintet

References

External links 
 

1961 births
Australian male singers
Australian songwriters
Noise rock musicians
Living people
Australian punk rock musicians
Australian multi-instrumentalists
Lubricated Goat members
Beasts of Bourbon members